Bessie Locke (August 7, 1865 – April 9, 1952) was an American educator and businessperson. In 1909, she founded the National Kindergarten Association, which promoted universal acceptance of the public-school kindergarten.

Life and career 
Locke was born on August 7, 1865, in West Cambridge, Massachusetts (today's Arlington), to William Henry Locke and Jane MacFarland Schouler. Her father was a printer.

She went to a private kindergarten in Brooklyn, New York, one that was amongst only a few in the United States at the time that was English-speaking.

She was educated in the public schools of Brooklyn, working as a teenager as a bookkeeper, before attending Columbia University; she did not obtain a degree, however.

After a two-year stint as an assistant to the pastor of All Souls Church in Brooklyn, Locke managed a hat-making store in North Carolina which was owned by her uncle.

In 1892, she visited a kindergarten in New York City which was operated by an acquaintance of hers. Impressed by the results of the children's education, she founded the East End Kindergarten Union of Brooklyn and, later, the Brooklyn Free Kindergarten Society. In 1899, she organized the New York Kindergarten Society.

Locke founded the National Association for the Promotion of Kindergarten Education in 1909. It became the National Kindergarten Association two years later. The company was initially based in New York City's brand-new Metropolitan Life Insurance Company Tower, located at 1 Madison Avenue in Manhattan, but later moved one mile north to 8 West 40th Street, on the southern side of Bryant Park. Locke's sister, May Aldrich, was the company's secretary and a director from the time of its establishment until her death, aged 80, in 1958.

One of several additional positions Locke held was as director of the National Council of Women of the United States. She was also an honorary vice-president of the International Council of Women.

Death 
Locke died on April 9, 1952, aged 86. She was buried in Hope Cemetery, Kennebunk, Maine, alongside her parents, who had retired to the town in the late 19th century, and several siblings. Her mother died in 1900, when Locke was around 35 years old; her father died in 1917, aged 79 or 80.

Her business remained in operation for the next 24 years, dissolving in 1976.

References

External links 

 Bessie Locke at a grave-finding website

1865 births
1952 deaths
People from Arlington, Massachusetts
19th-century American businesswomen
19th-century American businesspeople
20th-century American businesswomen
20th-century American businesspeople
19th-century American educators
20th-century American educators